Derryclare Lough is a freshwater lake at the entrance of the Inagh Valley, in Connemara, Galway, in the west of Ireland.

Geography
The Twelve Bens mountain range lies to the north of the lake, with the Ben of Derryclare  overlooking the lake itself. Derryclare Lough is fed from rivers from Lough Inagh, which itself is fed from several mountain streams in the area, but most importantly from the Gleninagh River that starts high up in the Gleninagh Valley on the slopes of Benbaun and Bencollaghduff, and the Tooreennacoona River. Derryclare Lough flows into Ballynahinch Lake, where it eventually joins the Owenmore River, and flows into Bertraghboy Bay.

Fishing
Derryclare Lough is noted for its lake and river fishing with spring salmon, grilse and sea trout, and the fishing is done from "Butts" (e.g. long piers from the shore), and particularly the Derryclare Butts, Glendollagh Butts, and the Greenpoint Butts.  The Lough and its fishing rights are privately owned and controlled by local fishing lodges in the Inagh Valley. Irish fishing author, Peter O'Reilly, said about Derryclare Lough that "This fishery has everything".

Scenic location
The lake is a popular scenic location, and extensively photographed, and offers views directly into the Glencoaghan Valley of the Twelve Bens and the peaks of the Glencoaghan Horseshoe, a 16–kilometre 8–9 hour route that is considered one of Ireland's best hill-walks. The lough bounds the 19-hectare Derryclare Nature Reserve a Statutory Nature Reserve, and the larger 789-hectare Derryclare Wood, a Coillte owned commercial conifer forest.

Gallery

Bibliography

See also

Lough Inagh
Twelve Bens
Mweelrea, major range in Killary Harbour
Maumturks, major range in Connemara
Lists of mountains in Ireland
List of loughs in Ireland

References

Derryclare
Connemara